
The following is a list of Playboy Playmates of 1968.  Playboy magazine names its Playmate of the Month each month throughout the year.

January

Connie Kreski (September 19, 1946 – March 21, 1995), an American model and actress, is Playboy magazine's Playmate of the Month for January 1968 and Playmate of the Year for 1969. Kreski had long taffy-colored hair and blue eyes.

Kreski died of a blocked carotid artery on March 21, 1995, in Beverly Hills, California.

February

Nancy Harwood (December 17, 1948 – May 13, 2014) was Playboy magazine's Playmate of the Month for its February 1968 issue. Her centerfold was photographed by William Figge and Ed DeLong. She describes herself in her Playboy.com biography page as "really inexperienced, still a virgin, in fact" at the time she posed for her centerfold.

Nancy had an older brother and an older sister.  Her father was a pharmacist. She became a representative for several jewelry makers, as well as the one-time president of the Centerfold Alumni Association.

March

Michelle Hamilton (born Roxanna Platt on December 20, 1948, in Elmira, New York) was Playboy magazine's Playmate of the Month for its March 1968 issue. She made a prior appearance in Playboy in the November 1967 issue in the Playboy Charter Yacht Party pictorial (starting on page 133) as "Roxanna". Her centerfold was photographed by William Figge and Ed DeLong.

April

Gaye Rennie (born September 21, 1949, in Los Angeles) was Playboy magazine's Playmate of the Month for its April 1968 issue. Her centerfold was photographed by William Figge and Ed DeLong.

May

Elizabeth Jordan (born January 11, 1945, in Fort Myers, Florida) was Playboy magazine's Playmate of the Month for its May 1968 issue. Her centerfold was photographed by Mario Casilli.

In addition to being a Playmate, Jordan was also a Bunny at the Playboy Clubs in Chicago, New York City and Atlanta. According to The Playmate Book, she later became the associate dean of an unnamed university in the Western United States.

June

Britt Fredriksen (born 1 October 1945 in Norway) was Playboy magazine's Playmate of the Month for its June 1968 issue. Her centerfold was photographed by Pompeo Posar.

July

Melodye Prentiss (December 14, 1944 in Chicago – March 3, 2009 in California) was Playboy magazine's Playmate of the Month for its July 1968 issue. Her centerfold was photographed by Pompeo Posar.
 
Melodye was working in the Playboy editorial library when she was "discovered" by the magazine as Playmate material. She studied fine art and painting at both the Chicago Academy of Fine Arts and the University of Chicago.

Prentiss died on March 3, 2009, after taking medications that made her unable to breathe following knee surgery and other illnesses.

August

Gale Olson (born October 27, 1947, in Fort Sill, Oklahoma) was Playboy magazine's Playmate of the Month for its August 1968 issue. Her centerfold was photographed by Ron Vogel.

Her mother was from New Zealand, and her father was in the United States Army.  Gale grew up with five brothers and three sisters.

For a time, Gale worked as a Bunny at the Chicago Playboy Club.

Olson's daughter, Crystal McCahill, appeared on the November 9, 2008 edition of The Girls Next Door at the Hooters near Chicago's O'Hare International Airport, in a radio interview with Bridget Marquardt and McCahill's tryout effort for the 55th anniversary edition of Playboy in January 2009.  McCahill is the May 2009 Playmate of the Month.

September

Drucilla Hart (born November 25, 1948, in San Fernando, California) was Playboy magazine's Playmate of the Month for its September 1968 issue. Her centerfold was photographed by Bill Figge and Mel Figge. At the time of her pictorial, Hart was working as a legal secretary.

October

Majken Haugedal (born 26 March 1947 in Copenhagen, Denmark) was Playboy magazine's Playmate of the Month for its October 1968 issue. Her centerfold was photographed by Pompeo Posar.

Posar is quoted in The Playmate Book as saying that Majken and Connie Kreski were the two finalists for the title of 1969 Playmate of the Year. Kreski won the title in the long run, but Majken posed for Playboy again in the April 1984 pictorial "Playmates Forever! Part Two."

November

Paige Young (March 16, 1944 – April 7, 1974) was Playboy magazine's Playmate of the Month for its November 1968 issue. Her centerfold was photographed by Peter Gowland.

December

Cynthia Myers (September 12, 1950 – November 4, 2011) was an American model and actress, and Playboy magazine's Playmate of the Month for the December 1968 issue.

Career
Cynthia Myers was the first Playboy Playmate born in the 1950s when she appeared in the magazine in December 1968. The pictures were shot in June 1968 when she was 17 years old, but it was Playboy'''s policy by that time to wait until a Playmate turned 18 before her pictures would be published.  Her centerfold was photographed by Pompeo Posar.

After her magazine debut, Myers made frequent appearances on Hugh Hefner's Playboy After Dark TV series in 1969. She took a leading role as the sensitive lesbian rock and roll singer and bass player, Casey Anderson, in Russ Meyer's Beyond the Valley of the Dolls. She followed that with a supporting role in the 1972 Western, Molly and Lawless John''.

Myers died of lung cancer in Los Angeles, California at the age of 61.

See also
 List of people in Playboy 1960–1969

References

1968-related lists
1968
Playmates Of 1968